Avi Resort & Casino is a hotel and casino located near the southern tip of Nevada on the banks of the Colorado River in Laughlin, Nevada, next to Fort Mohave, Arizona. Within walking distance of the California and Arizona borders, it is owned by the Fort Mojave Tribe and operated by Warner Gaming. It has a 465-room hotel, a  casino and a 260-space RV park with internet access.

The casino opened on February 17, 1995, and was built at cost of $60 million. It is one of two Nevada tribe owned Indian casinos located in Nevada, the other being the much-smaller Moapa Tribal Casino (2,500 square foot of gaming space), owned by the Moapa Band of Paiutes.

References

External links
 

1995 establishments in Nevada
Casino hotels
Casinos completed in 1995
Casinos in Laughlin, Nevada
Hotel buildings completed in 1995
Hotels established in 1995
Hotels in Laughlin, Nevada
Native American casinos
Resorts in Laughlin, Nevada
Native American history of Nevada